Pirogovo is the name of several rural localities in Russia.

Modern localities

Arkhangelsk Oblast
As of 2012, one rural locality in Arkhangelsk Oblast bears this name:
Pirogovo, Arkhangelsk Oblast, a village in Ilyinsky Selsoviet of Vilegodsky District

Belgorod Oblast
As of 2012, one rural locality in Belgorod Oblast bears this name:
Pirogovo, Belgorod Oblast, a selo in Alexeyevsky District

Ivanovo Oblast
As of 2012, two rural localities in Ivanovo Oblast bear this name:
Pirogovo, Ivanovsky District, Ivanovo Oblast, a village in Ivanovsky District
Pirogovo, Lukhsky District, Ivanovo Oblast, a village in Lukhsky District

Kaliningrad Oblast
As of 2012, one rural locality in Kaliningrad Oblast bears this name:
Pirogovo, Kaliningrad Oblast, a settlement in Khrabrovsky Rural Okrug of Guryevsky District

Kaluga Oblast
As of 2012, one rural locality in Kaluga Oblast bears this name:
Pirogovo, Kaluga Oblast, a village in Maloyaroslavetsky District

Kirov Oblast
As of 2012, two rural localities in Kirov Oblast bear this name:
Pirogovo, Lebyazhsky District, Kirov Oblast, a village in Lazhsky Rural Okrug of Lebyazhsky District
Pirogovo, Sovetsky District, Kirov Oblast, a village in Rodyginsky Rural Okrug of Sovetsky District

Kostroma Oblast
As of 2012, four rural localities in Kostroma Oblast bear this name:
Pirogovo, Buysky District, Kostroma Oblast, a village in Tsentralnoye Settlement of Buysky District
Pirogovo, Volzhskoye Settlement, Nerekhtsky District, Kostroma Oblast, a village in Volzhskoye Settlement of Nerekhtsky District
Pirogovo, Voskresenskoye Settlement, Nerekhtsky District, Kostroma Oblast, a village in Voskresenskoye Settlement of Nerekhtsky District
Pirogovo, Yemsnenskoye Settlement, Nerekhtsky District, Kostroma Oblast, a selo in Yemsnenskoye Settlement of Nerekhtsky District

Mari El Republic
As of 2012, one rural locality in the Mari El Republic bears this name:
Pirogovo, Mari El Republic, a village in Serdezhsky Rural Okrug of Sernursky District

Moscow Oblast
As of 2012, three rural localities in Moscow Oblast bear this name:
Pirogovo, Istrinsky District, Moscow Oblast, a village in Kostrovskoye Rural Settlement of Istrinsky District
Pirogovo (settlement), Mytishchinsky District, Moscow Oblast, a settlement under the administrative jurisdiction of Pirogovsky Work Settlement in Mytishchinsky District
Pirogovo (village), Mytishchinsky District, Moscow Oblast, a village under the administrative jurisdiction of Pirogovsky Work Settlement in Mytishchinsky District

Nizhny Novgorod Oblast
As of 2012, one rural locality in Nizhny Novgorod Oblast bears this name:
Pirogovo, Nizhny Novgorod Oblast, a village in Lindovsky Selsoviet under the administrative jurisdiction of the town of oblast significance of Bor

Novgorod Oblast
As of 2012, two rural localities in Novgorod Oblast bear this name:
Pirogovo, Pestovsky District, Novgorod Oblast, a village in Bogoslovskoye Settlement of Pestovsky District
Pirogovo, Soletsky District, Novgorod Oblast, a village in Dubrovskoye Settlement of Soletsky District

Perm Krai
As of 2012, one rural locality in Perm Krai bears this name:
Pirogovo, Perm Krai, a village in Karagaysky District

Pskov Oblast
As of 2012, one rural locality in Pskov Oblast bears this name:
Pirogovo, Pskov Oblast, a village in Velikoluksky District

Smolensk Oblast
As of 2012, one rural locality in Smolensk Oblast bears this name:
Pirogovo, Smolensk Oblast, a village in Vadinskoye Rural Settlement of Safonovsky District

Sverdlovsk Oblast
As of 2012, one rural locality in Sverdlovsk Oblast bears this name:
Pirogovo, Sverdlovsk Oblast, a selo in Kamensky District

Tula Oblast
As of 2012, two rural localities in Tula Oblast bear this name:
Pirogovo, Venyovsky District, Tula Oblast, a village in Aksinyinsky Rural Okrug of Venyovsky District
Pirogovo, Zaoksky District, Tula Oblast, a village in Gatnitsky Rural Okrug of Zaoksky District

Tver Oblast
As of 2012, two rural localities in Tver Oblast bear this name:
Pirogovo, Kalininsky District, Tver Oblast, a village in Verkhnevolzhskoye Rural Settlement of Kalininsky District
Pirogovo, Torzhoksky District, Tver Oblast, a village in Pirogovskoye Rural Settlement of Torzhoksky District

Udmurt Republic
As of 2012, two rural localities in the Udmurt Republic bear this name:
Pirogovo, Alnashsky District, Udmurt Republic, a village in Bayteryakovsky Selsoviet of Alnashsky District
Pirogovo, Zavyalovsky District, Udmurt Republic, a village in Pirogovsky Selsoviet of Zavyalovsky District

Vladimir Oblast
As of 2012, one rural locality in Vladimir Oblast bears this name:
Pirogovo, Vladimir Oblast, a village in Kameshkovsky District

Vologda Oblast
As of 2012, six rural localities in Vologda Oblast bear this name:
Pirogovo, Gryazovetsky District, Vologda Oblast, a village in Pertsevsky Selsoviet of Gryazovetsky District
Pirogovo, Kadnikovsky Selsoviet, Sokolsky District, Vologda Oblast, a village in Kadnikovsky Selsoviet of Sokolsky District
Pirogovo, Vorobyevsky Selsoviet, Sokolsky District, Vologda Oblast, a village in Vorobyevsky Selsoviet of Sokolsky District
Pirogovo, Syamzhensky District, Vologda Oblast, a village in Goluzinsky Selsoviet of Syamzhensky District
Pirogovo, Vologodsky District, Vologda Oblast, a village in Sosnovsky Selsoviet of Vologodsky District
Pirogovo, Vytegorsky District, Vologda Oblast, a village in Andomsky Selsoviet of Vytegorsky District

Voronezh Oblast
As of 2012, one rural locality in Voronezh Oblast bears this name:
Pirogovo, Voronezh Oblast, a selo in Semenovskoye Rural Settlement of Kalacheyevsky District

Yaroslavl Oblast
As of 2012, three rural localities in Yaroslavl Oblast bear this name:
Pirogovo, Lyubimsky District, Yaroslavl Oblast, a village in Pokrovsky Rural Okrug of Lyubimsky District
Pirogovo, Nekrasovsky District, Yaroslavl Oblast, a village in Klimovsky Rural Okrug of Nekrasovsky District
Pirogovo, Rybinsky District, Yaroslavl Oblast, a village in Shashkovsky Rural Okrug of Rybinsky District

Alternative names
Pirogovo, alternative name of Pirogovka, a selo in Pirogovka Selsoviet of Akhtubinsky District in Astrakhan Oblast;